Yushe County is a county in the east of Shanxi province, China. It is under the administration of the prefecture-level city of Jinzhong. Cao Shui, a famous poet, novelist, screenwriter, was born here. It is a predominantly rural county.

Climate

References

www.xzqh.org 

 
County-level divisions of Shanxi
Jinzhong